Slobodan Šljivančanin (born May 1, 1972) is a former professional basketball player. At 2.09 m (6 ft 10 in) in height, he played the center position.

Career
Šljivančanin started his pro career with KK Partizan (1990–91) and also played for OKK Beograd, Keravnos, BC UNICS, KK Crvena zvezda (2000–01), Pau-Orthez (2001), Elan Chalon (2001), KK Hemofarm (2001–02) and Ovarense (2002).

Šljivančanin represented Macedonia at international level. From 2001 to 2002, he played five games for their national team during the qualification for EuroBasket 2003.

Šljivančanin retired in October 2002 due to health problems.

External links
 FIBA profile

1972 births
Living people
Sportspeople from Nikšić
Montenegrin men's basketball players
Macedonian men's basketball players
Montenegrin expatriate basketball people in Serbia
Macedonian expatriate basketball people in Serbia
KK Beovuk 72 players
KK Partizan players
BC UNICS players
KK Crvena zvezda players
OKK Beograd players
Élan Béarnais players
Élan Chalon players
KK Hemofarm players
Montenegrin expatriate sportspeople in North Macedonia
Centers (basketball)